Mochtar Lubis (7 March 1922 – 2 July 2004) was an Indonesian Batak journalist and novelist who co-founded Indonesia Raya and monthly literary magazine "Horison". His novel Senja di Jakarta (Twilight in Jakarta in English) was the first Indonesian novel to be translated into English. He was a critic of Sukarno and was imprisoned by him.

Biography
Lubis was born on 7 March 1922 in Sungai Penuh, Kerinci Regency on Sumatra to Raja Pandapotan Lubis, a high-ranking civil servant, and his wife. He was the sixth child of twelve.

As a child, he wrote children's stories which were published in Sinar Deli, a Medan-based newspaper. When he was an adolescent, he often trekked into the jungles of Sumatra. He later wrote that two events during this period, seeing a well-built yet abandoned hut and having a close call with a tiger, served partly as his inspiration for Harimau! Harimau! (Tiger!, Tiger!)

After graduating from high school, he worked as a teacher in Nias, North Sumatra. However, after a year he left for Batavia, where he worked at a bank. When World War II broke out and the Japanese occupied Indonesia in 1942, Lubis began working for the Japanese, translating international news for the Japanese army.

After Indonesia declared its independence in 1945, Lubis joined the Indonesian news agency Antara as a reporter. With Antara, he covered the Asian Relations Conference in 1947. During this same period he wrote Jalan Tak Ada Ujung (The Road Has no End) and joined the Indonesian Visual Artists Association.

In 1949, he cofounded Indonesia Raya, later serving as the daily's chief editor. His work there led to him being imprisoned numerous times for his critical writing, including in Madiun, East Java, from 1957 to 1966. In 1955, while he was editor there, he hosted the African American author Richard Wright during his three weeks in Indonesia to attend the Bandung Conference. Indonesia Raya published several articles related to Wright during April and May 1955.

On 4 February 1975, he was arrested in relation to the 1974 riots during the visit of Japanese Prime Minister Kakuei Tanaka; Indonesia Raya was also shut down not long after the riots due to their reporting of the Pertamina corruption scandal. He spent over two months in Nirbaya prison without trial and was released on 14 April 1975. He noted that other prisoners, such as former Indonesian Air Force chief Omar Dani, had been imprisoned without trial for years. During his time there, he became an avid practitioner of yoga.

He founded and co-founded numerous magazines and foundations, including the Obor Indonesia Foundation in 1970, Horison magazine, and the Indonesian Green Foundation. He was also outspoken about the need for freedom of the press in Indonesia and gained a reputation as an honest, no-nonsense reporter. In 2000, he was named as one of the International Press Institute's 50 World Press Freedom Heroes of the past 50 years.

He was buried next to his wife in Jeruk Purut Cemetery.

He was married to Siti Halimah, who died in 2001. Together they had three children, who produced eight grandchildren.

Awards
In 1958, Lubis shared the Ramon Magsaysay Award for Journalism, Literature, and the Creative Communication Arts with Robert Dick, a publisher.

Lubis's novel Harimau! Harimau! was named Best Book by Yayasan Buku Utama, a part of the Indonesian Ministry of Education and Culture, in 1975, and received an award from Yayasan Jaya Raya (parent organization of the publisher ) in 1979.

Works

Novels

Short story collections

References

Bibliography
 
 
 

1922 births
2004 deaths
People of Batak descent
Indonesian journalists
Indonesian male novelists
People from Padang
Ramon Magsaysay Award winners
Indonesian male writers
Male journalists
Indonesian male short story writers
Indonesian short story writers
20th-century novelists
20th-century short story writers
20th-century male writers
20th-century journalists